Lesbian, gay, bisexual, and transgender ( LGBT or LGBTQ ) individuals in Alabama face legal challenges and discrimination not experienced by non-LGBTQ Alabamians. LGBTQ rights in Alabama—a Republican Party stronghold located in both the Deep South and greater Bible Belt—are limited in comparison to most other states.

Law regarding same-sex sexual activity
Same-sex sexual activity has been legal in Alabama since 2003, when the United States Supreme Court decision in Lawrence v. Texas struck down all state sodomy laws. On May 23, 2019, the Alabama House of Representatives passed, with 101 voting yes and 3 absent, Alabama Senate Bill 320, which repeals the ban on "deviate sexual intercourse". On May 28, 2019, the Alabama State Senate passed Alabama Senate Bill 320, with 32 yea and 3 absent. The bill took effect on September 1, 2019.

The age of consent in Alabama is 16 years old; however, sexual contact is legal with someone under 16 years and within 2 years of the older individual. In 2019, this provision was extended to members of the same sex. It had previously only been allowed for individuals of the opposite sex. A few other US states still keep these types of age-of-consent clauses, exclusively applying them to individuals of opposite sexes.

Recognition of same-sex relationships

On June 26, 2015, the U.S. Supreme Court's ruling in Obergefell v. Hodges made same-sex marriage legal nationwide. However, not all counties immediately complied, and instead they copied behavior from the civil rights era when they had refused to perform interracial marriages. By 2017, eight counties were still protesting by refusing to issue any marriage licenses at all.

In May 2019, the Alabama Legislature decided counties were required to record marriage certificates. On August 29, 2019, all Alabama counties began recording marriage certificates for all couples (including interracial and same-sex couples).

Previously, Alabama had banned the licensing of same-sex marriages and the recognition of such marriages from other jurisdictions by executive order in 1996, by statute in 1998, and by constitutional amendment in June 2006. There are still some legal prohibitions on same-sex marriage, but they are unenforceable. They are: Executive Order Number 24 by Governor Fob James, Alabama Code § 30-1-19, and Amendment 774 of the Constitution of the State of Alabama.

Adoption rights and parenting
Alabama permits adoption by same-sex couples.

Sexual orientation has sometimes been used as a reason to deny parents' rights. In 2002, the Supreme Court of Alabama ruled that"the homosexual conduct of a parent — conduct involving a sexual relationship between two persons of the same gender — creates a strong presumption of unfitness that alone is sufficient justification for denying that parent custody of his or her own children or prohibiting the adoption of the children of others. ... Homosexual conduct is, and has been, considered abhorrent, immoral, detestable, a crime against nature, and a violation of the laws of nature and of nature's God upon which this Nation and our laws are predicated. Such conduct violates both the criminal and civil laws of this State and is destructive to a basic building block of society — the family. The law of Alabama is not only clear in its condemning such conduct, but the courts of this State have consistently held that exposing a child to such behavior has a destructive and seriously detrimental effect on the children. It is an inherent evil against which children must be protected."However, the following year, the U.S. Supreme Court said in Lawrence v. Texas that states could not ban same-sex sexual activity.

Child Placing Agency Inclusion Act

Alabama is one of the few states to have a law protecting the right of faith-based adoption agencies to refuse to place a child with a certain couple or individual due to the agency's religious beliefs. The law was signed by Governor Kay Ivey in May 2017.

Discrimination protections

Federal law
Since 2011, gender identity has been applied to the definition of sex in Title VII of the Civil Rights Act of 1964 within the jurisdiction of the United States Court of Appeals for the Eleventh Circuit. Since 2020, sexual orientation has been applied to the definition of sex in Title VII of the Civil Rights Act of 1964.

State level
Alabama state law does not address discrimination based on sexual orientation and gender identity in employment, housing, discrimination in public accommodations, addresses harassment and/or bullying of students, and discrimination against students. The state law has neither a ban on insurance exclusions for transgender healthcare nor does it provide transgender-inclusive health benefits to state employees. However, in 2022, it became a felony for a medical provider to give gender-affirming care to a minor.

Local level
The city of Birmingham prohibits all discrimination on the basis of sexual orientation and gender identity. It approved such protections in September 2017. The city of Montevallo passed a similar non-discrimination ordinance in April 2018, becoming the second city in the state to have such protections.

Huntsville, Tuscaloosa, and Montgomery  have public employment protections on the basis of both sexual orientation and gender identity.

Hate crime law
Since 1994, Alabama has had a hate crime law applicable to "race, color, religion, national origin, ethnicity, or physical or mental disability." The current law does not apply to crimes committed on account of sexual orientation or gender identity.

On April 24, 2009, State Representative Alvin Holmes introduced HB533, a bill that would have added sexual orientation to the list of hate crime categories. State Representative Patricia Todd, the Legislature's first and only openly‐LGBTQ member, unsuccessfully attempted to add gender identity to the bill, but was opposed by Holmes and other legislators. Holmes said he believed that his bill covering only sexual orientation would protect persons victimized as a result of their gender identity. Holmes had introduced identical bills in previous sessions: HB829 (2008), HB247 (2007), HB57 (2006), HB423 (2001), HB85 (2000), and has pushed for the inclusion of sexual orientation in the hate crime law since at least 1999.

In April 2009, the Alabama House of Representatives passed Holmes' bill by a vote of 46 to 41. The Alabama Senate Judiciary Committee later approved the bill, but the full Senate took no action on it before the Legislature adjourned on May 15, 2009.

HB413 (2016) was sponsored by Todd and Representative Juandalynn Givan to add protections for sexual orientation and gender identity and HB8 (2017), but neither bill made it to a vote.

The Matthew Shepard and James Byrd Jr. Hate Crimes Prevention Act, approved by the United States Congress and signed into law by President Barack Obama in October 2009, bans such hate crimes federally.

Education
From 1992 to 2021, Alabama's no promo homo law said that "course materials and instruction that relate to sexual education or sexually transmitted diseases should include [...] an emphasis, in a factual manner and from a public health perspective, that homosexuality is not a lifestyle acceptable to the general public and that homosexual conduct is a criminal offense under the laws of the state." The law was repealed in April 2021 after Governor Kay Ivey signed the Alabama Legislature's bill to repeal all archaic references to "homosexuality and HIV/AIDS" in Alabama's post-1992 sex education laws.

Transgender rights

Gender-affirming healthcare 
Since May 8, 2022, it is a Class C felony for a medical provider to give gender-affirming care (including puberty blockers, hormones, or surgeries) to anyone under the age of 19. The medical provider can be punished by 10 years in prison. However, the ban was immediately challenged, and meanwhile it is not being enforced.

Alabama is the first U.S. state to implement a law like this. The bill, called the "Vulnerable Child Compassion and Protection Act", had been introduced in previous years. The Alabama Legislature passed it in early 2022 (SB 184), and Governor Kay Ivey signed it on April 8. It took effect one month later.

The state of Alabama hired Dr. James Cantor as an expert witness in defense of the ban of gender-affirming care for minors with gender dysphoria. However, on cross-examination, federal judge Liles C. Burke discovered that Cantor had no clinical experience diagnosing or treating minors with gender dysphoria, nor in monitoring such patients for improvements, and that he lacked knowledge of the treatments and methods used in gender clinics in the state of Alabama. As a result, Burke wrote that he gave Cantor's testimony "very little weight".

On May 13, 2022, five days after the law had taken effect, Burke temporarily halted the parts of the law that prohibit doctors from prescribing puberty blockers and hormone therapies from going into effect while the law is challenged in court. However the parts of the law that prohibit minors from receiving sex-altering surgeries remain in effect. An article in The New York Times summarized the changes:

A January 2023 review of the state of Alabama's expenses for the trans medical care suit revealed that the state had spent over $1 million on legal council, and over $500,000 on expert witnesses.

Five parents sued the state, arguing that the law prevented them from making decisions about their children's healthcare. The lawsuit is Boe v. Marshall. Alabama Attorney General Steve Marshall is a defendant. The state asked the parents for "all medical records" and "all documents" related to their children's "Gender Dysphoria", to any care provider who "treated" the children for gender dysphoria, and to "any mental health treatment" of these children.

Identity documents 
In January 2021, a federal judge said Alabama cannot require sex reassignment surgery to amend name and sex on a birth certificate. Alabama had been requiring this.

Transgender sports ban
Since July 1, 2021, Alabama requires single-sex sports teams in public schools to consider a student's "biological sex". The Alabama Legislature passed the bill earlier that year, and Governor Kay Ivey signed it.

Bathroom ban
A bill to require students to use school bathrooms consistent with the gender on their birth certificate passed the Alabama House of Representatives in February 2022 and the Alabama Senate in April 2022. The Senate version included an amendment to ban K–5 classroom "instruction" on sexuality and gender. The House will consider the amended version, and it also requires the governor's signature before it takes effect. In September 2022, the Alabama Board of Education implemented and codified the policy in full.

Politics
Patricia Todd, a member of the Alabama House of Representatives, was elected in November 2006 and became the first ever openly gay elected official in the state of Alabama. In September 2013, she married her wife, Jennifer Clarke, in Massachusetts.

In the 2018 Alabama House of Representatives election, Neil Rafferty, a former member of the United States Marine Corps, was elected to represent the 54th House District of Alabama. Rafferty became Alabama's first openly gay congressman. He resides in Birmingham with his husband Michael Rudulph.

Organizations
 Alabama Stonewall Democrats

Public opinion
A 2017 Public Religion Research Institute (PRRI) poll found that 42% of Alabamians supported same-sex marriage, while 51% were opposed. 7% were undecided.

Nevertheless, the same poll also found that 58% supported an anti-discrimination law covering sexual orientation and gender identity. 34% were against. Additionally, 51% were against allowing public businesses to refuse to serve LGBT people due to religious beliefs, while 41% supported allowing such religiously-based refusals.

Summary table

See also

LGBTQ rights in the United States
Equality Alabama
Politics of Alabama
No promo homo laws

Notes

References

Further reading
 

LGBT rights in Alabama